Robert Rodman (1940-2017) was a professor of computer science at North Carolina State University in Raleigh, North Carolina. Rodman attended UCLA, where he worked with linguist Victoria Fromkin and authored the bestselling linguistics textbook An Introduction to Language. He was also a novelist, his work published by Boson Books in Raleigh, North Carolina.

Dr. Rodman died in January 2017, from complications related to Inclusion Body Myositis.

Bibliography

External links
Robert Rodman page at NCSU

2017 deaths
Linguists from the United States
1940 births
North Carolina State University faculty